Godspeed is a 2016 Taiwanese black comedy road caper film written and directed by Chung Mong-hong and starring Michael Hui and Nadow. The film had its world premiere at the 2016 Toronto International Film Festival on 14 September 2016 and was theatrically released in Taiwan on 18 November.

Plot
Nadow (Nadow) is a jobless punk who often engages in stealing and cheating. One day, when he decides to find a stable job, he accidentally becomes a drug trafficker. On one occasion while transporting drugs, Nadow gets onto a taxi driven by Old Hui (Michael Hui), a Hong Konger married to a Taiwanese woman. A failed businessman in the past, Hui's only financial support is his old taxi which not many passengers are willing to ride. Old Hui and Nadow, two people of different backgrounds and personalities, ride down south together.

What seems like an ordinary delivery trip causes the duo to be entangled in an extortion case and a murder case involving rival gangs. As their journey and lives constantly changes, it also tests their trust for each other and their newly formed friendship. Just when their lives were at stake, everything seems to have been pre-arranged.

Cast

Starring
 Michael Hui as Old Hui (老許)
 Na Dow as Nadow (納豆)
 Leon Dai
 Tou Chung-hua as Brother Tou (庹哥)
 Matt Wu as Hsiao-wu
 Vicent Liang as Little Liang (小梁)
 Chen Yi Wen as Wen (阿文)
 Vithaya Pansringarm

Cameo
 Jag Huang as Mourner
 Chung Yi-tseng
 Lin Mei-hsiu as Hui's wife
 Chen Yu-hsun

Accolades

References

External links
 
 

2016 films
2016 black comedy films
2010s crime comedy films
2010s heist films
2010s road movies
Taiwanese heist films
Taiwanese black comedy films
Films about the illegal drug trade
Films directed by Chung Mong-hong
Films set in Taiwan
Films shot in Taiwan
2010s Mandarin-language films